Austria competed at the 1952 Summer Olympics in Helsinki, Finland. 112 competitors, 91 men and 21 women, took part in 70 events in 16 sports.

Medalists

Athletics

Boxing

Canoeing

Cycling

Road Competition
Men's Individual Road Race (190.4 km)
Walter Bortel — did not finish (→ no ranking)
Franz Wimmer — did not finish (→ no ranking)
Arthur Mannsbarth — did not finish (→ no ranking)

Track Competition
Men's 1.000m Time Trial
Kurt Nemetz
 Final — 1:17.5 (→ 21st place)

Men's 1.000m Sprint Scratch Race
Kurt Nemetz — 15th place

Diving

Men's 3m Springboard
Franz Worisch
 Preliminary Round — 67.18 points (→ 10th place)

Women's 10m Platform
Eva Pfarrhofer
 Preliminary Round — 40.26 points (→ 9th place)

Fencing

Men's sabre
 Werner Plattner
 Heinz Lechner
 Hubert Loisel

Men's team sabre
 Werner Plattner, Heinz Putzl, Hubert Loisel, Heinz Lechner, Paul Kerb

Women's foil
 Ellen Müller-Preis
 Fritzi Wenisch-Filz
 Grete Kunz

Football

Gymnastics

Hockey

Rowing

Austria had four male rowers participate in one out of seven rowing events in 1952.

 Men's coxless four
 Kurt Marz
 Alexander Mitterhuber
 Adolf Scheithauer
 Johann Geiszler

Sailing

Open

Shooting

Three shooters represented Austria in 1952.
Men

Swimming

Water polo

Weightlifting

Wrestling

References

External links
Official Olympic Reports
International Olympic Committee results database

Nations at the 1952 Summer Olympics
1952
Summer Olympics